H10 Hotels is a hotel chain with head offices in Barcelona that has been in operation since the late 1980s when its founder, Josep Espelt, opened his first hotel on the Costa Daurada. The chain has over 63 hotels in 22 destinations, most of them owned by the company, offering more than 16,000 rooms.
 
H10 Hotels is a hotel chain with 51 locations within Spain, and internationally, where it has twelve establishments. At the international level, the chain aims to continue its expansion in the capital cities of Europe, where it already has hotels in Rome, London, Venice and Berlin, in addition to the Caribbean, with establishments in Punta Cana, Riviera Maya and Jamaica.

Locations 
 Barcelona
 Madrid
 Seville
 Salou
 Cordoba
 Tarragona
 Rome
 Venice
 London
 Berlin
 Lisbon
 Tenerife
 Lanzarote
 Fuerteventura
 La Palma
 Gran Canaria
 Mallorca
 Costa del Sol
 Costa Daurada
 Costa Blanca
 Riviera Maya
 Punta Cana
 Jamaica
Benidorm

Notes 

Hotel chains in Spain
Companies based in Barcelona